Eastern Associated Coal Corp. v. Mine Workers, 531 U.S. 57 (2000), was a case in which the Supreme Court of the United States ruled that public policy considerations do not require courts to refuse to enforce an arbitration award ordering an employer to reinstate an employee truck driver who twice tested positive for marijuana.

Background 
Eastern Associated Coal and the United Mine Workers were parties to a collective bargaining agreement which contained provisions requiring arbitration.  One such provision, key to the case, was that in any arbitration hearing where Eastern sought to discharge an employee, Eastern had to prove "just cause" for the discharge; otherwise, the arbitrator would order the employee to be reinstated.  The arbitrator's decision in any such case was final.

James Smith, a truck driver for Eastern, was subject to random drug testing as his position was deemed "safety sensitive".  In March 1996 Smith tested positive for marijuana.  Eastern sought to discharge Smith, but the arbitrator ruled that Smith's positive drug test was not "just cause" and ordered Smith reinstated, subject to certain conditions including future drug testing.

Smith would be tested four times between April 1996 and January 1997; each time, no drugs were found.  But in July 1997 Smith again tested positive for marijuana, and again Eastern sought discharge.  Once again, however, the arbitrator ruled that Smith should be reinstated with conditions, one of which was that he was to provide a signed, undated letter of resignation, to take effect should Smith test positive within the next five years.

This time, Eastern filed suit in District Court, seeking to have the arbitrator's decision vacated on grounds that it "contravened a public policy against the operation of dangerous machinery by workers who test positive for drugs."  Although the District Court recognized the "strong regulation-based public policy" against workers in "safety sensitive" positions, it ruled that Smith's conditional reinstatement did not violate that policy, and ordered the enforcement of the arbitrator's decision.

The United States Court of Appeals for the Fourth Circuit affirmed the District Court's decision.  The Supreme Court granted certiorari on the basis that the Circuit Courts disagreed on whether the mandatory reinstatement of employees using illegal drugs was against public policy.

See also
 List of United States Supreme Court cases, volume 531
 List of United States Supreme Court cases

References

External links
 

United States Supreme Court cases
United Mine Workers of America litigation
United States arbitration case law
2000 in United States case law
United States Supreme Court cases of the Rehnquist Court
United States labor case law
United States controlled substances case law
Cannabis in Kentucky
Drug testing